Manning is a city in Carroll County, Iowa, United States, along Iowa Highway 141. The population was 1,455 at the time of the 2020 census.  It is named for Orlando Harrison Manning, a Lieutenant Governor of Iowa.

History
Prior to the city's formation, the area of Manning was a swampy region occasionally used by local Iowa (people) for hunting. There were no nearby rivers and few trees.

The Iowa Southwestern railroad was completed in 1880. Some yards and a depot were constructed at the future location of Manning in  1881. In the same year, the Chicago, Milwaukee, and St. Paul Railroad constructed a road across Iowa, south of and parallel to, the Northwest. These railroads intersected at what is now Manning.

In 1969, an unknown saboteur used dynamite to bomb one of the rails and derail the passenger train traveling on the east——west Milwaukee railroad line (presently the Burlington Northern), apparently hoping that it would careen into the Nishnabotna river below.  The train came to a safe stop but only after it derailed. The crime was never solved; no group claimed responsibility and no motive for the bombing was ever discovered.

Geography
Manning is located at  (41.908642, -95.063218), along the West Nishnabotna River near its source.

Demographics

2010 census
As of the census of 2010, there were 1,500 people, 653 households, and 398 families residing in the city. The racial makeup of the city was 98.1% White, 0.7% African American, 0.4% Native American, 0.3% Asian, 0.1% from other races, and 0.5% from two or more races. Hispanic or Latino of any race were 1.1% of the population.

There were 653 households, of which 28.6% had children under the age of 18 living with them, 49.8% were married couples living together, 8.1% had a female householder with no husband present, 3.1% had a male householder with no wife present, and 39.1% were non-families. 35.1% of all households were made up of individuals, and 18.7% had someone living alone who was 65 years of age or older. The average household size was 2.19 and the average family size was 2.81.

The median age in the city was 45.5 years. 23% of residents were under the age of 18; 6.5% were between the ages of 18 and 24; 19.8% were from 25 to 44; 24.4% were from 45 to 64; and 26.3% were 65 years of age or older. The gender makeup of the city was 47.9% male and 52.1% female.

2000 census
As of the census of 2000, there were 1,490 people, 650 households, and 391 families residing in the city. The racial makeup of the city was 98.79% White, 0.20% Native American, 0.60% Asian, 0.27% from other races, and 0.13% from two or more races. Hispanic or Latino of any race were 0.47% of the population.

There were 650 households, out of which 23.5% had children under the age of 18 living with them, 50.8% were married couples living together, 7.2% had a female householder with no husband present, and 39.7% were non-families. 37.4% of all households were made up of individuals, and 22.8% had someone living alone who was 65 years of age or older. The average household size was 2.18 and the average family size was 2.88.

23.4% were under the age of 18, 5.2% from 18 to 24, 22.3% from 25 to 44, 20.9% from 45 to 64, and 28.2% were 65 years of age or older. The median age was 44 years. For every 100 females, there were 83.0 males. For every 100 females age 18 and over, there were 80.5 males.

The median income for a household in the city was $32,083, and the median income for a family was $43,021. Males had a median income of $28,214 versus $19,432 for females. The per capita income for the city was $16,806. About 3.7% of families and 7.9% of the population were below the poverty line, including 5.4% of those under age 18 and 14.1% of those age 65 or over.

Notable people

 Matt Campbell (born 1970), lawyer and unsuccessful candidate for the United States House of Representatives in 2010.
 James Drees (1930-2022), farmer and Iowa state legislator.
 John R. Hansen (born 1901–1974), U.S. Representative from Iowa. A native and lifelong resident of Manning.
Tom Knudson (born 1953), American journalist and a two-time Pulitzer Prize winner in 1985 and 1992. Born in Manning.

Education
IKM–Manning Community School District operates public schools serving the community. It was in the Manning Community School District until it merged in to IKM-Manning on July 1, 2011.

Kuemper Catholic School System is in nearby Carroll.

Community colleges in the vicinity include Des Moines Area Community College (DMACC) Carroll Campus, Western Iowa Tech Community College (WITCC or WIT) Denison Campus, and Iowa Western Community College (IWCC) Shelby County Center and Cass County Center.

Notable historical sporting accomplishments
The 1948 boys basketball team won the state of Iowa championship under Coach Bill Steneker.  In a game reminiscent of the movie Hoosiers,  the small town of Manning defeated the much larger urban school of Davenport by a score of 46–43. Team members were: Jim Farrell, Louis Bohsack, Richard Geith, Robert Koch, Merlin Rostermundt, Royce Rowedder, Danny Peters, Jerry Knaack, Leland Kienast, Willis Lohmeier, Leroy Kienast. The assistant Coach was Bill Andreson.

In 2002, the Manning High School football team won the State of Iowa Class A championship under coach  Floyd Forman.  Their season record was 12–1, and they won the final game against  Fredericksburg (10–3) by a score of 52–0.

The 2009 girls basketball team, now consolidated with IKM schools (Irwin, Kirkman, Manilla),  won the State of Iowa Class 2A championship defeating Cascade 50–31. They finished the season with a record of  26-2 under coach Gene Rasmussen.

References

External links
 City website

 
Cities in Iowa
Cities in Carroll County, Iowa
Populated places established in 1880
1880 establishments in Iowa